A1 is a national highway in Kazakhstan that runs from Nur-Sultan to Petropavl with a total length of . It is part of the European route E125.

The route starts in Nur-Sultan on the Nur-Sultan bypass junction, where it travels north-west and meets the start of the R6 highway and continues. It ends near the city of Shchuchinsk on the junction with the R7 highway. It restarts in north of Kokshetau next to the A13 highway and finishes its route in Petropavl.

History 
The reconstruction of Nur-Sultan - Shchuchinsk  section started in 2006. It ended 3 year later in 2009.

The toll road on the Nur-Sultan – Shchuchinsk section was introduced in 2013.

In 2017, the reconstruction of the Kokshetau — Petropavl section was completed.

References 

Roads in Kazakhstan